Carmelo Pujia (25 October 1852, Filadelfia - 20 August 1937) was an Italian bishop and archbishop.

Offices
Bishop of Anglona-Tursi - appointed 13 July 1897, ordained bishop 16 January 1898
Archbishop of Santa Severina - appointed 30 October 1905
Bishop of Crotone (suffragan of Reggio archdiocese) - appointed 13 February 1925
Archbishop of Reggio Calabria - appointed 11 February 1927, installed 10 July 1927

External links
http://www.gcatholic.org/dioceses/diocese/regg0.htm
http://www.catholic-hierarchy.org/bishop/bpuja.html

1852 births
1937 deaths
Bishops in Calabria
Roman Catholic archbishops in Italy
People from the Province of Vibo Valentia